One Wild Ride is a 1925 short silent comedy film directed by Robert F. McGowan. It was the 45th Our Gang short subject released.

Synopsis
The gang has a taxi, consisting of an old Model T with no engine, pushed by a horse.  When the owner takes his horse back, they must rely on motorists to tow them to the top of the hill so they can coast down.  Little Farina borrows the car and it runs out of control all over town, causing mayhem everywhere it goes.

Notes
This 1925 Our Gang short was remade in the 1932 Little Rascals short Free Wheeling.

Cast

The Gang
 Joe Cobb as Joe
 Jackie Condon as Jackie
 Mickey Daniels as Mickey
 Johnny Downs as Johnnie
 Allen Hoskins as Farina
 Mary Kornman as Mary

Additional cast
 Jackie Hanes as Little Bellingham
 Unknown actress as Little girl
 Ed Brandenburg as Sprinter
 Richard Daniels as Johnnie's grandfather
 F. F. Guenste as Butler
 Al Hallett as Man with bird cage
 Fay Holderness as Governess
 Dorothy Vernon as Mickey's mother
 Pal the Dog as Himself

See also
 Our Gang filmography

References

External links

1925 films
American silent short films
American black-and-white films
1925 comedy films
Films directed by Robert F. McGowan
Hal Roach Studios short films
Our Gang films
Films with screenplays by H. M. Walker
1925 short films
1920s American films
Silent American comedy films